Alcyoniidae is a family of leathery or soft corals in the phylum Cnidaria.

Description
A colony of leathery coral is stiff, hard and inflexible. It is composed of tiny polyps projecting from a shared leathery tissue. Members of the family may have two kinds of polyps; the autozooids have long trunks and eight tiny branched tentacles and project from the shared leathery tissue while the siphonozooids remain below the surface and pump water for the colony. They appear as tiny hollows or mounds among the taller autozooids. Different genera have different proportions of these two kinds of polyps. The autozooids only emerge when the colony is fully submerged.

Distribution and habitat
Leathery corals occur globally in temperate and tropical seas. They are often pioneer reef species and are found in wave-exposed areas of reef crests, less turbid waters in lagoons, on steep slopes, under overhangs and at depths of thirty metres or even deeper.

Biology

Leathery coral polyps include endosymbiotic algae called zooxanthellae. The algae undergo photosynthesis and produce sugars from sunlight. This food is shared with the host, which itself provides the algae with minerals and shelter. Periodically, the surface layer of the leathery tissue is shed. This seems to be a mechanism for ridding the colony of unwanted algal growth.

In a study on the Great Barrier Reef, it was found that the population of these corals was very stable. There was little predation, low rates of growth, reproduction and mortality, few new colonies came into existence and few disappeared over a three-year period.

Genera
The following genera are recognized in the family Alcyoniina:
 Alcyonium Linnaeus, 1758
 Aldersladum Benayahu & McFadden, 2011
 Anthomastus Verrill, 1878
 Bathyalcyon Versluys, 1906
 Bellonella Gray, 1862
 Cladiella Gray, 1869
 Complexum Van Ofwegen, Aurelle & Sartoretto, 2014
 Dampia Alderslade, 1983
 Discophyton McFadden & Hochberg, 2003
 Elbeenus Alderslade, 2002
 Eleutherobia Puetter, 1900
 Hedera Conti-Jerpe & Freshwater, 2017
 Heteropolypus Tixier-Durivault, 1964
 Inflatocalyx Verseveldt & Bayer, 1988
 Klyxum Alderslade, 2000
 Lanthanocephalus Williams & Starmer, 2000
 Lithophyton
 Lobophytum Marenzeller, 1886
 Lobularia Savigny
 Lohowia Alderslade, 2003
 Malacacanthus Thomson, 1910
 Minabea Utinomi, 1957
 Notodysiferus Alderslade, 2003
 Paraminabea Williams & Alderslade, 1999
 Parerythropodium Kuekenthal, 1916
 Protodendron Thomson & Dean, 1931
 Pseudoanthomastus Tixier-Durivault & d'Hondt, 1974
 Rhytisma Alderslade, 2000
 Sarcophyton Lesson, 1834
 Sinularia May, 1898
 Skamnarium Alderslade, 2000
 Sphaeralcyon Lopez-Gonzalez & Gili, 2005
 Sphaerasclera McFadden & van Ofwegen, 2013
 Thrombophyton
 Verseveldtia Williams, 1990

See also
 Alcyonium digitatum
 Alcyonium glomeratum

References

 
Alcyoniina
Cnidarian families